Nitryl azide (tetranitrogen dioxide) is an unstable nitrogen oxide consisting of a covalent nitrogen–nitrogen bond between a nitro group and an azide. It has been detected by infrared spectroscopy as a short-lived product of the reaction between sodium azide and nitronium hexafluoroantimonate:

The compound quickly decomposes to form nitrous oxide. Calculations suggest this process that occurs via an oxatetrazole oxide intermediate:

References 

Azido compounds
Nitrogen oxides